Road 39 is a road in Khuzestan. All of this road is expressway. It connects Abadan to Ahvaz and it is used for transit from Abadan port. Then it goes to Shushtar, Northeast of Ahvaz. After that it goes north to Dezful. And at last it goes to north to Andimeshk via expressway.

References

External links 

 Iran road map on Young Journalists Club

Roads in Iran